Les Ambassadeurs or Ambassadeurs may refer to:
 Les Ambassadeurs (film), a 1977 French-Tunisian film
 Ambassadeurs (lithograph), an 1892 lithograph poster by Henri de Toulouse-Lautrec
 Les Ambassadeurs (restaurant), a Parisian restaurant
 Les Ambassadeurs Club, a London casino
 Les Ambassadeurs, a Malian musical group

See also
 Ambassadeur, a Swedish fishing reel
 Ambassador (disambiguation)